Gorcott Hill is a small hamlet in the civil parish of Tanworth-in-Arden, in the Stratford-on-Avon district, in the county of Warwickshire, England. It is near the villages of Mappleborough Green & Studley, which are both in Warwickshire. Gorcott Hill is also near the large Worcestershire town of Redditch.

Hamlets in Warwickshire
Tanworth-in-Arden